Ana Marcos Moral (born 9 July 2000) is a Spanish professional footballer who plays as a forward for Liga F club Sporting de Huelva.

Club career
Anita Marcos started her career at Torrelodones.

References

External links
Profile at La Liga

2000 births
Living people
Women's association football forwards
Spanish women's footballers
Footballers from Seville
Atlético Madrid Femenino players
Celtic F.C. Women players
Valencia CF Femenino players
Sporting de Huelva players
Scottish Women's Premier League players
Primera División (women) players
Spanish expatriate women's footballers
Spanish expatriate sportspeople in Scotland
Expatriate women's footballers in Scotland
Spain women's youth international footballers